Charles Russell Harris (April 2, 1914 – September 10, 1993) was an American tennis player in the 1930s.

Harris reached the singles final at the Tri-State Tennis Tournament, now known as the Cincinnati Masters, in 1936 before losing to future Hall of Famer Bobby Riggs in straight sets.

Harris won the doubles title at the French Championships in 1939 with his partner was Don McNeill.

Harris had five children - Charles Harris, Robert Harris, William Harris, Betty Harris, Mary Harris. His son William Harris, was also a tennis player.

Grand Slam finals

Doubles (1 title)

References

References
Charles Harris' obituary
Charles Harris' grave: https://www.findagrave.com/memorial/170748723/charles-russell-harris

American male tennis players
French Championships (tennis) champions
1914 births
1993 deaths
Grand Slam (tennis) champions in men's doubles